One One One is the sixth studio album by the Norwegian band Shining, released through Universal on April 8, 2013, and Indie Recordings on June 7, 2013.

Overview 
The Norwegian band Shining started out as an acoustic jazz quartet, but the sound of this new album, like its predecessor, Blackjazz, is more experimental and extreme than the band's first releases. It incorporates elements from black metal, progressive rock, and 19th and 20th Century classical music with the foundations of jazz music.

Reception 

The album was well received by critics, with Heavy Blog Is Heavy awarding the album 4.5 out of 5 stars, and the Norwegian newspaper Dagbladet rating the album a 5 out of 6.

Track listing

CD version 
"I Won't Forget" (3:51)
"The One Inside" (4:04)
"My Dying Drive" (4:06)
"Off the Hook" (3:37)
"Blackjazz Rebels" (3:38)
"How Your Story Ends" (4:39)
"The Hurting Game" (4:09)
"Walk Away" (3:38)
"Paint the Sky Black" (4:19)

LP version 
Side A
"I Won't Forget" (3:51)
"The One Inside" (4:04)
"My Dying Drive" (4:06)
"Off the Hook" (3:37)
Side B
"Blackjazz Rebels" (3:38)
"How Your Story Ends" (4:39)
"The Hurting Game" (4:09)
"Walk Away" (3:38)
"Paint the Sky Black" (4:19)

Personnel 
Jørgen Munkeby – Vocals, guitars, saxophone
Torstein Lofthus – Drums
Tor Egil Kreken – Bass
Håkon Sagen – Guitar

Credits 
Co-producer and mixing – Sean Beavan
Design – Trine + Kim Design Studio
Mastering – Tom Baker
Producer, composer, recording – Jørgen Munkeby
Recorded by Mike Hartung

Notes 
Partly funded by A-ha, Norsk Kulturråd, Fond for utøvende kunstnere, Fond for lyd og bilde and Tekstforfatterfondet.

References

External links 

Fisheye single on Last.fm

Shining (Norwegian band) albums
2013 albums